Vicia cassubica, called Kashubian vetch and Danzig vetch, is a species of flowering plant in the genus Vicia, native to most of Europe, Turkey, the Levant, the Caucasus and Iran. Found in thermophilous oak forests, it also does well in old fields that are in later stages of succession.

References

cassubica
Plants described in 1753